Carestiella is a genus of lichen-forming fungi in the family Stictidaceae. It contains two species: Carestiella socia and Carestiella schizoxyloides.

References

Ostropales
Lichen genera
Ostropales genera
Taxa described in 1897
Taxa named by Giacomo Bresadola